Tito Okello (born 7 January 1996) is a South Sudanese footballer who plays as a forward for Iranian club Paykan FC and the South Sudan national team.

International career
Okello made his debut for the South Sudan national football team on 10 October 2020 against Cameroon B

International goals
Scores and results list South Sudan's goal tally first.

References

External links

1996 births
Living people
Acholi people
People with acquired South Sudanese citizenship
South Sudanese footballers
Association football forwards
African Lyon F.C. players
Mbeya City F.C. players
S.L. Benfica de Macau players
Tanzanian Premier League players

South Sudan international footballers
South Sudanese expatriate footballers
South Sudanese expatriate sportspeople in Tanzania
Expatriate footballers in Tanzania
South Sudanese expatriate sportspeople in Macau
Expatriate footballers in Macau
South Sudanese expatriate sportspeople in Kenya
Expatriate footballers in Kenya
South Sudanese expatriate sportspeople in Iran
Expatriate footballers in Iran
People from Gulu District
Ugandan footballers
SC Villa players
Bul FC players
Kampala Capital City Authority FC players
Vipers SC players
Uganda Premier League players
Ugandan people of South Sudanese descent
Sportspeople of South Sudanese descent
Ugandan expatriate footballers
Ugandan expatriate sportspeople in Tanzania
Ugandan expatriate sportspeople in Macau
Ugandan expatriate sportspeople in Kenya
Ugandan expatriate sportspeople in Iran